Sarada Vilas College, located in the city of Mysore, Karnataka, India was established in the year 1945 as an Intermediate college. Seven years later, it was upgraded as a Degree college. It now offers eight combinations encompassing  physical as well as natural science, all leading to the B.Sc. degree. Students can pursue any one of the following combinations.

Physics, chemistry and mathematics (PCM)
Physics, electronics and mathematics (PEM)
Physics, mathematics and computer science (PMCS)
Electronics, mathematics and computer science (EMCS)
Chemistry, botany and zoology (CBZ)
Biochemistry, microbiology and biotechnology (BMBt)
Chemistry, zoology and biotechnology (CZBt)
Biochemistry, microbiology and botany (MBB)

The college, affiliated to the University of Mysore, is covered under  Sec.2(f) and Sec. 12(B) of the UGC Act right from inception. It was accredited by NAAC in 2004 and reaccredited in 2010 with ‘B’ Grade with CGPA of 2.89.

The college expanded its academic activities by launching B.Com. and B.B.M. from 2013 to 2014. It further extended its educational initiative by offering M.Sc. in chemistry from 2014 to 2015.

The college has an elite faculty with many Doctorates and several M.Phils. Teachers, endowed with knowledge and experience, update themselves by participating in seminars, workshops and refresher courses. The college invites scholars to deliver special lectures to enable the students to expand their horizon.
 
The college follows government norms and admits students from all sections of the society, irrespective of their social and economic background and status. It is a coeducational college.

History
The saga of Sarada Vilas Educational Institutions began in the year 1861 when His Highness Mummadi Sri Krishnaraja Wodeyar, the then ruler of Mysore state, directed his courtman Rao Bahadur Sri Bhakshi Narasappa to start an Educational Institution in Mysore so as to make the town a Centre for Education.

In keeping with the desire of the king, Sri Narasappa founded a school and named it Sarada Vilas Anglo-Sanskrit School. In the beginning it was housed in a temple and later shifted to Lansdowne building.

In 1899, the king formed a Governing Body to manage the affairs of the school. Sri M. Venkatakrishnaiah, popularly called Tataiah, was named the Secretary. He was mainly instrumental in developing the Institution. In 1904, the school was shifted to the Lansdowne building. The High school section was started in 1917 which was shifted to its own building in 1931.

In 1945, the Institution started an Intermediate College with Sri M.S. Ramaswamy as Founder Principal. In the year 1952, it was upgraded and began to offer the B.Sc. course.

The Institution expanded its activities further by starting law college in 1954, Girls High School in 1961, Teachers College in 1963 and Pharmacy College in 1992.

Facilities
In order to encourage the students to develop their all-round personality, the college lays emphasis on both curricular and co-curricular activities.  Keeping this in view, the college offers a wide range of facilities for the benefit of students. These include:

 Library
 Career Guidance and Placement Cell
 Multi-Speciality Gymnasium
 Network Resource Centre

Notable alumni
 N. R. Narayana Murthy, Founder, INFOSYS
 Dr. V. S. Arunachalam, Former Defence Advisor, Government of India
 Sethumadhava Rao, Joint Secretary (Retired), UGC
 Prof. K. S. Rangappa, Former Vice-Chancellor, University of Mysore
 Dr. H. A. Ranathnga, Director (Retired), NAAC
Master Hirannaiah, Theatre Personality
 V. Srinivas Prasad, Former Minister, Government of Karnataka
 H. R. Leelavathi, Sugama Sangeetha Artiste
 Go. Madhusudan, Ex MLC, Karnataka
 S. R. Mahesh, Minister, Government of Karnataka
 N. V. Madhusudana, physicist, Shanti Swarup Bhatnagar laureate

References

Universities and colleges in Mysore
Educational institutions established in 1945
1945 establishments in India
Colleges affiliated to University of Mysore